Raimond Roger (Occitan: Ramon Roger) (died 27 March 1223) was the sixth count of Foix from the House of Foix. He was the son and successor of Roger Bernard I and his wife Cécilia Trencavel.

When Raimond-Roger and Arnaud, viscount of Castelbon, wished to join their possessions, the Count Ermengol VIII of Urgell and Bernard de Villemur, bishop of Urgell, saw in this a threat and declared war. Overcome and captured, the count of Foix and Arnaud were imprisoned from February to September 1203. King Peter II of Aragón intervened, however, wishing to spare them for his fight to conquer Languedoc. Moreover, Peter II gave as a fief the castles of Trenton and Quérigut (1209) to Raimond-Roger, after having already given various other Catalan seigniories (1208).

Raimond Roger was a close relative of Raymond VI of Toulouse and a staunch ally.  He was famed for his generalship, chivalry, fidelity, and affection for haute couture. He was, besides a patron of troubadours, an author of verse himself.  Though not a Cathar himself, several of his relatives were.  His wife, Philippa of Montcada, even became a parfaite.  His sister, Esclarmonde de Foix, was also a parfaite, receiving the Consolamentum at Fanjeaux in 1204.  Raimond Roger was a great orator, and attended the Fourth Lateran Council of 1215 to defend Raymond of Toulouse before Innocent III and the council.  He himself was accused of having murdered priests and did not deny it, instead he informed the pope that he regretted not having murdered more.

He had with Philippa of Montcada;
Roger Bernard who became his heir.
Cécile de Foix, who married (c.1224) Count Bernard V of Comminges.

He also had two illegitimate children.

Notes

References
 

1223 deaths
House of Foix
Counts of Foix
Christians of the Third Crusade
People of the Albigensian Crusade
Occitan nobility
Year of birth unknown